Bridges is the twelfth studio album by American recording artist Joe, released on June 24, 2014. It is his first album under his new label Plaid Takeover Entertainment after severing business ties with his longtime manager Kedar Massenburg. The first single released from the album was "Love & Sex Pt. 2", which features singer Kelly Rowland. It debuted at number 17 on the Billboard 200 chart, with first-week sales of 15,126 copies in the United States. In its second week, the album dropped to number 40, selling 7,000 copies, bringing its total album sales to 80,000.

Track listing
Credits adapted from the album's liner notes.

Samples
"Mary Jane (Remix)" contains replay of "Mary Jane", composed and recorded by Rick James.

Personnel
 Andre "East Coast Dre": mixing
 Dave Kutch: mastering
 Walid Azami: photography
 Pamela Watson: styling, creative director
 Aaron "Sincere" Boyd: creative art direction

Charts

Weekly charts

Year-end charts

References

External links
[ Bridges] at Allmusic

2014 albums
Joe (singer) albums